Pattikkad is a junction in the outskirts of Thrissur district of Kerala, India. The junction is situated beside the Salem-Kochi National Highway.

Location
Pattikkad is situated about 13 km north-east of Thrissur, 21 km from vadakkanchry of Palakkad district and 7 km from Peechi Dam and the Power Grid Corporation of India HDVC Station.

Transportation
National Highway 544 (India) [Earlier NH-47], a six lane highway passes through Pattikkad. Kerala State Road Transport Corporation and private buses are available to Thrissur, Palakkad (towards the east), Elanad, Govindapuram, Pollachi, and Peechi sides.

References

Villages in Thrissur district